Nokia 130 (2017) is a Nokia-branded mobile phone developed by HMD Global. It was released on 17 July 2017 (alongside the Nokia 105 (2017)) and is available in a Single and Dual-SIM card configuration. The selectable colours are black, white and red.

Specification 
The phone has almost the same features as the predecessor. It is slightly larger (111.5 x 48.4 x 14.2 mm compared to 106 x 45.5 x 13.9 mm), has small optical design changes, image support, a file manager, and more games, like Air Strike, Danger Dash, Ninja Up, Sky Gift and Nitro Racing. It also features a rear-camera and an LED-flashlight at the top.

Even though the camera can be used to take photos and record videos, the resolution is limited to 640 x 480 pixel for images and 176 x 144 pixel for videos. Furthermore by default videos are recorded in only 9.598 frames per second and the built in memory of 8 MB holds less than 2 minutes of video footage. Neither the used image or video resolution nor their quality can be changed.

The Nokia 130 uses a Mini-SIM card for the Single as well as the Dual-SIM model and has a dedicated microSDHC card slot.

Even though the Nokia 130 has a camera, can display images and supports GPRS as well as EDGE, it is not able to display images that were received in a MMS-messages. The phone does support Bluetooth 3.0, but it can neither be paired with iOS devices nor can it receive images via a Bluetooth connection when no microSD card is inserted.

The phone does not have a front-camera, and does not include WLAN nor GPS.

Gallery

References

External links 

 Nokia 130 (2017) on nokia.com

130 (2017)
Mobile phones introduced in 2017
Mobile phones with user-replaceable battery